("Research, Assistance, Intervention, Deterrence"), commonly abbreviated RAID, is an elite tactical unit of the French National Police. It is headquartered in Bièvres, Essonne, approximately 20 kilometres (12 miles) southwest of Paris. This is an elite police unit founded in 1985. RAID is the National Police counterpart of the National Gendarmerie's GIGN. Both units share responsibility for the French territory.

Since 2009, RAID and the Paris Research and Intervention Brigade (BRI), a separate National Police unit reporting directly into the Paris Police Prefecture, have formed a task force called National Police Intervention Force or FIPN. When activated, the task force is headed by the RAID commander. Thirteen regional units of the National Police, previously known as National Police Intervention Groups (GIPNs), have been created or permanently integrated into RAID and re-designated as "RAID branches" between 2015 and 2019.

Missions

Among the main missions of RAID are:
 Counter-terrorism in coordination with UCLAT, the co-ordination unit for the fight against terrorism.
 Hostage recovery situations
 Close protection of VIPs
 Protection of some of the French embassies in war-torn countries (a mission shared with the Gendarmerie's GIGN)
 Site protection during special events
 Resolution of prison riots
 Assistance to other police departments fighting against organized crime 
 Surveillance and arrest of high-profile criminals
 Arrest of dangerous deranged persons
 Training and assistance to foreign police forces
 Assessment of new equipment and techniques.

RAID reports to the director general of the National Police (DGPN), himself a direct report of the minister of the interior.

History
Before the creation of RAID, the National Police did not have a national unit comparable to the Gendarmerie's GIGN and relied instead on regional units: BRI in Paris and the GIPNs in the provinces. Minister of the Interior Pierre Joxe was the key decision maker who authorized the creation of the unit. RAID was founded by then-commissaires Robert Broussard and Ange Mancini in 1985. Broussard, one of the best known Police commissaires at the time, was one of the advisers who pushed the project. Mancini was chosen to be the unit's first commander. RAID's first mission - a hostage situation in a Nantes tribunal, took place soon afterwards in December 1985.

In 1987 RAID arrested the leaders of the terrorist group Action Directe in their Vitry-aux-Loges hideout. In May 1993, RAID solved a delicate hostage situation when a man named Erick Schmitt, calling himself "HB" (for "Human Bomb", in English), and carrying large quantities of explosives, took 21 hostages in a Neuilly-sur-Seine nursery school. The hostage taker was finally shot and the children were recovered safely, together with their teacher and a nurse. In 1996, in Roubaix, the unit neutralized the Gang de Roubaix, a 14-member terrorist group tied to the Armed Islamic Group of Algeria (GIA), suspected of several bank robberies, murders, and a failed attack against the Group of Seven (G7) meeting in Lille. The assault was very violent and resulted in the death of four terrorists. Two RAID operatives were also injured, one by a grenade blast, the other hit by a bullet in a lung. Christophe Caze, the head of the group, escaped the burning building, but was killed at a Belgian checkpoint during a gunfight with Customs agents. Several days later, thanks to an electronic device found on Caze's body, Fateh Kamel, head of a terrorist cell in Montreal, was arrested in Jordan and tried in France.

RAID operators saw action during the 2005 and 2006 riots in France, as well as in a hostage situation in Versailles, where an armed man was shot dead by RAID operators after coming under attack. On 21 and 22 March 2012, RAID was tasked to arrest Mohammed Merah, the main suspect for shooting sprees in Toulouse and Montauban. RAID surrounded the flat where Merah was entrenched. After 30 hours of siege, RAID stormed the flat to apprehend Merah who fought back. After a four-minute shoot out, Merah was shot by a RAID sniper while exiting the building.

On 9 January 2015 RAID, together with BRI, a unit of the Paris Metropolitan Police, ended the hostage situation at the kosher supermarket Hypercacher on the third day of the January 2015 Paris terrorist attacks. On 14 November 2015 RAID, again with the Paris BRI, took part in operations at the Bataclan theatre, where 90 people were killed during a series of bombings, shootings and hostage taking in Paris on 13 – 14 November. On 18 November RAID undertook a follow-up operation in Saint-Denis seeking Abdelhamid Abaaoud, the 'mastermind' of the attacks, who was killed.

RAID also provides close protection for foreign dignitaries traveling in France. During special events, RAID is also in charge of protecting French individuals abroad (For example, the French Delegation during the Olympic Games is under RAID protection during the whole event).

Three RAID officers have been killed in action: two in Ris-Orangis (near Paris) in 1989 and one in Corsica in 1996.

Organisation

RAID has a total strength of around 450 men and women, approx. 180 of which are in Bièvres, the rest in the regional branches located in Bordeaux, Guadeloupe, Lille, Lyon, Marseille, Montpellier, Nancy, New Caledonia, Nice, Rennes, Réunion, Strasbourg and Toulouse. The Bièvres (Paris) unit is divided into three main sections with about 60 members each:

 First Section: The first section deals with the usual tasks of special forces: intervention, monitoring, protection.

 Second Section: The second section is the Research and Development unit of the RAID. It studies techniques and collects information. This section is divided into three groups:
Intelligence Group
Technical Group
Weaponry Group
 
 Third section: The Third section deals with the psychological aspects of the interventions. It is in charge of negotiations and crisis management. It also provides psychological support for the policemen in the unit and in the whole French Police. It is composed of forensic experts, a psychologist and physicians.

The Negotiation group is on permanent alert. It deals with suicides, violent crises, mental disorders, hostage crises and other major troubles, independently from the rest of the RAID. It assesses the dangers of the situation, suggests possible solutions, and helps with the negotiations and the resolution of the crises. If the whole RAID has to intervene, the Negotiations section is used as a reconnaissance unit, and prepares the intervention of the other sections. To join the unit, an officer needs five years duty within the Police Nationale and after passing a thorough test he will serve in the RAID for five years. With a commendation he can expand it further five years. All members must leave the tactical unit after ten years. Candidates must be under forty to apply. Female officers are admitted in almost all positions.

Helicopter support is provided by Sécurité Civile and the National Gendarmerie. Tactical deployment of large groups is handled by GIH a joint army/air force special operations flight equipped with SA330 PUMA helicopters based in nearby Villacoublay air base. GIH was established in 2006, initially to support GIGN. Its role has been expanded to also support RAID in 2008.

Coordination between GIGN and RAID is handled by a joint organization called Ucofi. A "leader/follower" protocol has been established for use when both units need to be engaged jointly, leadership belonging to the unit operating in its primary area of responsibility.

RAID is also a member of the European ATLAS Network, an informal association consisting of the special police units of the 28 states of the European Union.

RAID Commanders 
 Ange Mancini: 1985-1990
 Louis Bayon: 1990-1996
 Gérard Zerbi: 1996-1999
 Jean-Gustave Paulmier: 1999-2002
 Christian Lambert: 2002-2004
 Jean-Louis Fiamenghi: 2004-2007
 Amaury de Hauteclocque: 2007-2013
 Jean-Michel Fauvergue: 2013-2017
 Jean-Baptiste Dulion: since 2017

Specialties
 Assault Groups
 Sniper
 Parachutist
 Diver
 Demolition
 Breaching
 Group of Research and Information
 Dog handlers
 Logistics
 Negotiators

Equipment

Weapons 
 
 Benelli M3
 Beretta M3P4
 Colt M4A1
 FN Herstal Five-seveN
 FN Herstal P90
FN SCAR
FN Herstal Minimi
Franchi SPAS-15
Glock 17 / 17L / 18 / 19 / 26 / 34
Heckler & Koch G36
Heckler & Koch HK53
Heckler & Koch HK69A1
Heckler & Koch MP5K
Heckler & Koch PSG1
Manurhin MR 73
PGM Précision Hécate II
PGM Précision Ultima Ratio
Remington 870
Rheinmetall MG3
SIG Sauer SG553
Saiga-12
Kel-Tec KSG
 Bastinelli Knives FIXED R.E.D V2 
 Bastinelli Knives Grozo

Vehicles 

Nexter Titus
Petit Véhicule Protégé

See also
Groupe d'Intervention de la Gendarmerie Nationale (GIGN)
ATLAS Network
Counter-terrorism
List of special police units
National Liberation Front of Corsica

Notes

References

Bibliography
The following books and articles are in French.

Books

 (DVD included)

Magazines

External links

 
 
 

ATLAS Network
National Police (France)
Non-military counterterrorist organizations
Police tactical units
1985 establishments in France